FK Baník Sokolov is a Czech football club based in Sokolov. The club plays in the Bohemian Football League, which is the third tier of Czech football.

Historical names
 1948 – SK HDB Falknov nad Ohří
 1948 – ZTS Sokol HDB Sokolov
 1953 – DSO Baník Sokolov
 1962 – TJ Baník Sokolov
 1992 – FK Baník Sokolov

Players

Current squad
.

Out on loan

Notable former players

History in domestic competitions

 Seasons spent at Level 1 of the football league system: 0
 Seasons spent at Level 2 of the football league system: 14
 Seasons spent at Level 3 of the football league system: 1
 Seasons spent at Level 4 of the football league system: 0

Czech Republic

References

External links 
  Official website

 
Banik Sokolov
Association football clubs established in 1948
Baník Sokolov
1948 establishments in Czechoslovakia